Jean Breuer (born 1 March 1938) is a retired German cyclist who specialized in motor-paced racing. As amateur he won a silver medal at the UCI Motor-paced World Championships in 1972 and a gold medal in 1974. He then changed to professionals and won a bronze medal in 1975. 

His son Christoph Breuer is also a competitive cyclist.

References

1938 births
Living people
German male cyclists
People from Hürth
Sportspeople from Cologne (region)
Cyclists from North Rhine-Westphalia